Tributaries and sub-tributaries are hierarchically listed in order from the mouth of the Rio Grande upstream. Major dams and reservoir lakes are also noted.

 San Juan River, or Rio San Juan (Tamaulipas, Nuevo León, Coahuila)
 Marte R. Gómez Dam and Marte R. Gómez Reservoir (Tamaulipas)
 Pesquería River, or Río Pesquería (Nuevo León)
 Salinas River, or Río Salinas (Nuevo León)
 Rio Alamo, or Alamo River (Tamaulipas)
 Las Blancas Dam (Tamaulipas)
 Falcon Dam and Falcon International Reservoir (Tamaulipas and Texas)
 Salado River, or Rio Salado (Coahuila, Nuevo León, and Tamaulipas)
 Sabinas Hidalgo River (Nuevo León)
 Candela River, Rio Candela (Nuevo León and Coahuila)
 Presa Venustiano Carranza (dam and reservoir) (Coahuila)
 Rio Nadadores (Coahuila)
 Rio Monclova (Coahuila)
 Sabinas River, or Rio Sabinas (Coahuila)
 Rio Alamos (Coahuila)
 San Ildefonso Creek (Texas)
 Chacon Creek (Texas)
 San Ygnacio Creek (Texas)
 Zacate Creek (Texas)
 Sombrerillito Creek (Texas)
 Santa Isabel Creek (Texas)
 Rio Escondido (Coahuila)
 Arroyo San Antonio, or Rio San Antonio (Coahuila)
 Rio San Rodrigo (Coahuila)
 La Fragua Dam and La Fragua Reservoir (Coahuila)
 Las Moras Creek(Texas) 
 Tequesquite Creek (Texas) (Texas)  
 Rio San Diego (Coahuila and Nuevo León)
 Cow Creek (Rio Grande) (Texas) 
 Pinto Creek (Texas)
 Sycamore Creek (Val Verde County) (Texas)
 Mud Creek (Kinney County) (Texas)
 Zorro Creek (Val Verde County) (Texas)
 San Felipe Creek (Texas)
 Arroyo de las Vacas (Coahuila)
 Arroyo de los Jaboncillos (Coahuila)
 Amistad Dam and Amistad Reservoir (Texas and Coahuila)
 Devils River (Texas)
 Pecos River (Texas and New Mexico)
 Red Bluff Dam and Red Bluff Reservoir (Texas and New Mexico)
 Delaware River (Texas and New Mexico)
 Black River (New Mexico)
 Rio Penasco (New Mexico)
 Rio Felix (New Mexico)
 Cow Creek (New Mexico)
 Rio Hondo (New Mexico)
 Two Rivers Reservoir (New Mexico)
 Rio Bonito (New Mexico)
 Rio Ruidoso (New Mexico)
 Gallinas River (New Mexico)
 San Francisco Creek (Texas)
 Maravillas Creek (Texas)
 Arroyo del a Guaje (Coahuila)
 Laguna del Guaje (Coahuila)
 Terlingua Creek (Texas)
 Rio San Carlos (Chihuahua)
 Alamito Creek (Texas)
 Rio Conchos (Chihuahua and Durango)
 El Granero Dam (Luis L. Leon Dam) and El Granero Reservoir (Chihuahua)
 Rio Chuviscar (Chihuahua)
 Rio Sacramento (Chihuahua)
 San Pedro River, or Rio San Pedro (Chihuahua)
 Francisco I. Madero Dam and Francisco I. Madero Reservoir (Chihuahua)
 Rio Santa Isabel (Chiahuahua)
 Florido River, or Rio Florido (Chihuahua and Durango)
 Parral River, or Rio Parral (Chihuahua and Durango)
 Lago Colina Dam and Lake Colina (Chihuahua)
 La Boquilla Dam and Toronto Lake (Chihuahua)
 Balleza River, or Rio Balleza (Chihuahua and Durango)
 Rio Nonoava (Chihuahua)
 Green River (Texas)
 Rio Viego (Chihuahua)
 International Dam and International Reservoir (Texas and Chihuahua)
 American Diversion Dam and American Reservoir (Texas)
 Rincon Arroyo (New Mexico)
 Caballo Dam and Caballo Lake (New Mexico)
 Elephant Butte Dam and Elephant Butte Reservoir (New Mexico)
 Rio Salado (New Mexico)
 Rio Puerco (New Mexico)
 Rio San Jose (New Mexico)
 Rio San Juan (New Mexico)
 Bluewater Creek (New Mexico)
 Bluewater Lake (New Mexico)
 Jemez River (New Mexico)
 Jemez Canyon Dam and Jemez Canyon Reservoir (New Mexico)
 Rio Salado (New Mexico)
 Rio Guadalupe (New Mexico)
 San Antonio Creek (New Mexico)
 East Fork Jemez River (New Mexico)
 Jaramillo Creek
 Santa Fe River (New Mexico)
 Cochiti Dam and Cochiti Lake (New Mexico)
 Rio Chiquito (New Mexico)
 Pojoaque River (New Mexico)
 Rio Chupadero (New Mexico)
 Santa Cruz River (New Mexico)
 Rio Chama (New Mexico and Colorado)
 Rio Ojo Caliente (New Mexico)
 Rio Vallecitos (New Mexico)
 Rio Tusas (New Mexico)
 Rio del Oso (New Mexico)
 Gallina Creek (New Mexico)
 El Rito (New Mexico)
 Abiquiu Creek (New Mexico)
 Vallecitos Creek (New Mexico)
 Abiquiu Dam and Abiquiu Lake (New Mexico)
 Cañones Creek (New Mexico)
 Polvadera Creek (New Mexico)
 Chihuahueños Creek (New Mexico)
 Barrancones Creek (New Mexico)
 Canjilon Creek (New Mexico)
 Rio Puerco (New Mexico)
 Coyote Creek (New Mexico)
 Poleo Creek (New Mexico)
 Rito Redondo (New Mexico)
 Rito Resumidero (New Mexico)
 Rio Gallina (New Mexico)
 Rio Capulin (New Mexico)
 Rio Cebolla (New Mexico)
 Rio Nutrias (New Mexico)
 El Vado Dam and El Vado Lake (New Mexico)
 Willow Creek (New Mexico)
 Heron Dam and Heron Lake (New Mexico)
 Rio Brazos (New Mexico)
 Rio Chamita (New Mexico)
 Rio de Truchas (New Mexico)
 Rio Pueblo de Taos (New Mexico)
 Rio Hondo (New Mexico)
 Red River (New Mexico)
 Costilla Creek
 Conejos River (Colorado)
 Rio San Antonio (Colorado)
 Rio de los Pinos (Colorado and New Mexico)
 North Fork Rio de los Pinos (Colorado)
 Rio Nutritas (New Mexico)
 Platoro Dam and Platoro Reservoir (Colorado)
 Alamosa River (Colorado)
 South Fork Rio Grande (Colorado)
 Rio Grande Dam and Rio Grande Reservoir (Colorado)

See also
 List of rivers of Colorado
 List of rivers of Mexico
 List of rivers of New Mexico
 List of rivers of Texas
 List of rivers of the Americas

References

Rio Grande
Tributaries of the Rio Grande
Tributaries of the Rio Grande
Tributaries of the Rio Grande
Tributaries of the Rio Grande
International rivers of North America
Rio Grande